Rubus bartonianus, or Barton's raspberry, is an uncommon North American species of flowering plant in the rose family. It is found only in north-central Idaho and northeastern Oregon in the northwestern United States.

The species is named for Mrs. Ralph Barton of Wallowa County, Oregon, who brought the plant to the attention of botanist Morton Eaton Peck.

The genetics of Rubus is extremely complex, so that it is difficult to decide on which groups should be recognized as species. There are many rare species with limited ranges such as this. Further study is suggested to clarify the taxonomy.

References

bartonianus
Plants described in 1934
Flora of Oregon
Flora of Idaho
Flora without expected TNC conservation status